The W. E. Upjohn Institute for Employment Research is an American research organization based in Kalamazoo, Michigan. Its purpose is to find and promote solutions to employment-related problems.

Background 
The W. E. Upjohn Institute for Employment Research is an activity of the W. E. Upjohn Unemployment Trustee Corporation which was established in 1932 by Dr. W. E. Upjohn, founder of the Upjohn Company. The Trustee Corporation established the Upjohn Institute in 1945 for the purpose of "conducting research into the causes and effects of unemployment and measures for the alleviation of unemployment."

Today, with a staff of about 100, the Institute conducts and funds research into employment-related issues, as well as administers federal and state employment programs, including Michigan Works! Southwest, for four counties in southwest Michigan. In addition, the Institute performs program design and evaluations for government entities worldwide. The Institute also staffs and houses the leading academic journal Economic Development Quarterly.

History 

In addition to being the founder and longtime president of the Upjohn Company, William Erastus Upjohn's interests extended into civic affairs. He established Kalamazoo's commission-manager (also called council-manager) form of government and was elected the city's first mayor. Along with establishing what later became the Upjohn Institute, which he called "the most important thing I ever did," Upjohn also contributed seed money for what became the Kalamazoo Community Foundation and for donating the Civic Auditorium to the city.

Prominent economist Randall W. Eberts, a former senior staff economist on the President's Council of Economic Advisors, served as Upjohn Institute president for 25 years before being succeeded, in 2019, by current President Michael Horrigan.

Notable staff 
 Michael Horrigan, President
 Susan Houseman, Vice President and Director of Research
 Randall W. Eberts, Senior Researcher
 Aaron Sojourner, Senior Researcher
 Timothy J. Bartik, Senior Economist

References

External links 
 W. E. Upjohn Institute for Employment Research

Think tanks established in 1945
Think tanks based in the United States